The women's foil was one of seven fencing events on the Fencing at the 1928 Summer Olympics programme. It was the second appearance of the event. The competition was held from 31 July 1928 to 1 August 1928. 27 fencers from 11 nations competed.

Results
Source: Official results; De Wael

Round 1

Each pool was a round-robin.  Bouts were to five touches.  The top four fencers in each pool advanced to the semifinals.

Pool A

Pool B

Pool C

Pool D

Semifinals

Each pool was a round-robin. Bouts were to five touches. The top four fencers in each pool advanced to the final.

Semifinal A

Semifinal B

Final

The final was a round-robin. Bouts were to five touches.

References

Foil women
1928 in women's fencing
Women's events at the 1928 Summer Olympics